Vladimir Fayzulovich Fayzulin (born 25 November 1952) is a Russian professional football coach and a former player.

Club career
As a player, he made his debut in 1972 in the Soviet Second League for Barrikady Volgograd.

Personal life
He is an ethnic Tatar.

References

1952 births
Living people
Soviet footballers
Association football midfielders
FC Rotor Volgograd players
FC SKA Rostov-on-Don players
FC Spartak Vladikavkaz players
Soviet football managers
Russian football managers
FC Rotor Volgograd managers
Russian Premier League managers
FC Sibir Novosibirsk managers
FC Metallurg Lipetsk managers
FC Spartak Kostroma players